Bison Dele (born Brian Carson Williams; April 6, 1969 – July 7, 2002) was an American professional basketball player who played center for the NBA's Orlando Magic, Denver Nuggets, Los Angeles Clippers, Chicago Bulls and Detroit Pistons. Dele won a championship with the Bulls in 1997. He is believed to have been murdered at sea by his older brother Miles Dabord in 2002. His girlfriend, Serena Karlan, and skipper Bertrand Saldo are also presumed to have been killed by Dabord.

Early life and NCAA career 
Williams was born on Easter Sunday, April 6, 1969,  in Fresno, California, the second son of Patricia Phillips and of singer Eugene "Geno" Williams Jr. of the musical group The Platters, who later divorced. Patricia Phillips remarried and raised her two sons in Fresno until that marriage ended when Brian was in junior high. He was of African-American and Cherokee descent.

As a junior in high school, he attended Bishop Gorman High School in Las Vegas, Nevada. He averaged 17.3 points, 12.7 rebounds, 2.1 assists, 2.5 steals and 9.1 blocks per game in his senior season, shooting 57.7% from the field. As a senior, he attended Saint Monica Catholic High School in Santa Monica, California, where his jersey is retired. He was a track and field runner, until a high school growth spurt pushed him towards basketball. His collegiate basketball career began at the University of Maryland, where he played for one year before sitting out the next season while transferring to the University of Arizona.

Professional career 
After playing for two seasons at Arizona, Williams was drafted with the 10th pick in the first round of the 1991 NBA Draft by the Orlando Magic. He saw limited action during two seasons in Orlando.

After playing for Orlando, Williams joined the Denver Nuggets, for whom he played two seasons. In 1993–94, he played a career-high 80 games and averaged 8.0 points per game. Williams then played one year for the Los Angeles Clippers, earning increased playing time and averaging 15.8 points per game. Due to a contract dispute and reports that Williams' asking price was too high, he could not find a team at the beginning of the 1996–97 season, sitting out most of the season. He was then signed by the Chicago Bulls nine games before the end of the season and became an important backup player in the Bulls' run to their fifth championship. Williams finished his career playing two seasons with the Detroit Pistons, where he set career highs of 16.2 points and 8.9 rebounds per game in 1997–98.

In 1998, he changed his name to Bison Dele to honor his Native American (Cherokee) and African ancestry, and played his final season under that name.

Retirement 
Dele suddenly retired from the NBA before the start of the 1999–2000 season at age 30, when he was still in the prime of his career. He had been the Pistons' highest-paid player, but had strained relationships with the organization and decided to walk away from the remaining five years and US$36.45 million on his contract rather than be traded. It has also been theorized he had never been especially passionate about playing basketball and felt he had earned enough money to allow him to walk away from the pro game and lifestyle.

Personal life 
Dele reportedly dated Madonna at one point in his career. He played the saxophone, violin and trumpet, enjoyed adventure travel, and earned a pilot's license. After his retirement he spent long periods traveling to Lebanon, the Mediterranean, and the Australian outback before learning to sail and purchasing a catamaran.

Disappearance in the South Pacific 
On July 6, 2002, Dele and his girlfriend, Serena Karlan, along with skipper Bertrand Saldo, sailed from Tahiti on Dele's catamaran, the Hukuna Matata.  Dele's brother, Miles Dabord (born Kevin Williams), was the only person involved in the voyage who was seen or heard from after July 8, 2002, when the last of three satellite phone calls from the voyage was made. Dele and Karlan had previously kept regular contact with their banks and family members. On July 20, Dabord brought the boat into Tahiti; he was alone aboard the vessel.

On September 6, 2002, police used a sting operation organized by Dele's family and friends to detain Dabord in Phoenix. Dabord had forged Dele's signature in order to buy US$152,000 worth of gold under his brother's name, using Dele's passport as identification.  Mexican police later found that Dabord had been staying at a hotel in Tijuana, Mexico. Two days before, the Hukuna Matata, which had been registered in Tahiti under another name, was found off the coast of Tahiti with its name plate removed and some possible bullet holes patched. About the same time, Dabord phoned his mother, Patricia Phillips, telling her that he would never hurt Dele and that he could not survive in prison.

The FBI and French authorities became involved in the investigation, and concluded that Dele, Karlan and Saldo were probably murdered and then thrown overboard, by Dabord. Given that the bodies were likely dumped in the middle of the Pacific Ocean, it would be highly unlikely that the three would ever be found.

Dabord, the only first-person source of information regarding the case, intentionally overdosed on insulin and slipped into a coma. On September 27, 2002, Dabord died in a California hospital. In his account of events, Dabord said he and his brother had fought, and that Karlan had been accidentally hit and died when her head struck part of the boat. When Saldo wanted to report her death, a panicked Dele killed him; Dabord then shot his brother in self-defense, threw the bodies overboard and subsequently fled back to the U.S. It is not known if Dabord's story is true that Dele wanted to kill Saldo, and that Dabord had to shoot Dele in self-defense, as that would not explain why Dabord allegedly threw all three bodies overboard, and subsequently overdosed on insulin purposely instead of explaining to authorities what had happened, if that were all true. After Dabord's death, officials did not expect to find much more regarding the case. A memorial service was then held for both Dele and Dabord.

The brothers were frequently at odds with each other. After Dabord's death, his lawyer and lifelong friend, Paul White, was questioned regarding Dabord but was somewhat evasive and gave little information about what happened.

See also 
 List of people who disappeared at sea

References

External links 
 TV Crime Sky News Dark Waters Murder In The Deep
 ESPN: Former Piston Bison Dele reported to be missing at sea
 CBS News: Cops believe ex-NBA player was slain
 ESPN: Paradise Lost
 Investigation Discovery: Disappeared (Season 1) The story centers around Bison's girlfriend Serena but he's a big part of the documentary.
 Bison Dele's statistics

1969 births
2000s missing person cases
2002 deaths
African-American basketball players
American men's basketball players
American people of Cherokee descent
Arizona Wildcats men's basketball players
Basketball players from Los Angeles
Centers (basketball)
Chicago Bulls players
Denver Nuggets players
Detroit Pistons players
Los Angeles Clippers players
Male murder victims
Maryland Terrapins men's basketball players
McDonald's High School All-Americans
Missing people
Native American basketball players
Orlando Magic draft picks
Orlando Magic players
Parade High School All-Americans (boys' basketball)
People declared dead in absentia
People lost at sea
Sportspeople from Fresno, California
20th-century African-American sportspeople
21st-century African-American people
Bishop Gorman High School alumni